An Ashtray Heart is a bootleg album by Captain Beefheart and his Magic Band. Recorded live in Toronto in 1981, it was released in 2011 after Beefheart's death in late 2010.

Track listing

 "Nowadays a Woman's Gotta Hit a Man"
 "Abba Zaba"
 "Hot Head"
 "Ashtray Heart"
 "Dirty Blue Gene"
 "Best Batch Yet"
 "A Carrot Is As Close As A Rabbit Gets To A Diamond"
 "Doctor Dark"
 "Bat Chain Puller"
 "Sheriff Of Hong Kong"
 "Kandy Korn"
 "Big Eyed Beans From Venus"

Bonus tracks
 "When Big Joan Steps Up"
 "Woe-Is-Uh-Me-Bop"
 "Bellerin' Plain"
 "Orange Claw Hammer" (radio broadcast with Frank Zappa, 1975)
 "Hot Head" (Saturday Night Live)
 "Ashtray Heart" (Saturday Night Live)

Captain Beefheart albums
2011 live albums
Live albums published posthumously